The black-chinned whistler (Pachycephala mentalis) is a species of bird in the family Pachycephalidae, endemic to Halmahera and adjacent smaller islands in North Maluku in Indonesia.

Taxonomy and systematics
It is variably considered a subspecies of the Australian golden whistler or treated as a separate species, but strong published evidence in favour of either treatment is limited, and further study is warranted to resolve the complex taxonomic situation.

Subspecies 
Three subspecies are recognized:
 P. m. tidorensis – van Bemmel, 1939: Found on Tidore and Ternate islands
 P. m. mentalis – Wallace, 1863: Found on Bacan, Halmahera and Morotai islands 
 P. m. obiensis – Salvadori, 1878: Originally described as a separate species. Found on Obi Islands (Obi and Bisa)

Description
The black-chinned whistler is the northernmost member of the golden whistler group, being bordered to the south by the yellow-throated whistler. The black-chinned whistler is relatively large, and males are white-throated, have an incomplete black chest-band (only distinct in the center of the chest; does not connect to the black head) and a small black chin (lacking in Obi Islands).

References

black-chinned whistler
Birds of the Maluku Islands
black-chinned whistler